Ruhlsdorf may refer to several places in Germany:

Ruhlsdorf (Jessen), a civil parish of Jessen, in Brandenburg
Ruhlsdorf (Marienwerder), a civil parish of Marienwerder, in Brandenburg
Ruhlsdorf (Nuthe-Urstromtal), a civil parish of Nuthe-Urstromtal, in Brandenburg
Ruhlsdorf (Strausberg), a civil parish of Strausberg, in Brandenburg
Ruhlsdorf (Teltow), a civil parish of Teltow, in Brandenburg